Mite Kremnitz (4 January 1852, Greifswald – 18 July 1916 in Berlin), born Marie von Bardeleben (pen names George Allan, Ditto and Idem), was a German writer.

Biography
Kremnitz was the daughter of the famous surgeon Heinrich Adolf von Bardeleben. She grew in Greifswald, London and, starting with 1868, in Berlin. Later she married the doctor Wilhelm Kremnitz and moved with him to Bucharest in 1875. The couple had 2 children.

In Romania, Marie became good friends with the Queen Elisabeth, who wrote poems, novels and short stories under the nom de plume Carmen Sylva, and in 1881 she was appointed her maid of honor. They published several novels and a drama in collaboration, Marie signing with the pseudonym Ditto and Idem. Starting with 1890 she changed it to Mite Kremnitz.

After her husband's death in 1897, Kremnitz returned to Berlin. She died on 18 July 1916, aged 64.

Works
 Rumänische Dichtungen ("Romanian Poems"), 1881
 Fluch der Liebe ("The Curse of Love"), short stories, 1881
 Neue rumänische Skizzen ("New Romanian Sketches"), 1881
 Rumänische Märchen ("Romanian Fairy-Tales"), 1882
 Aus der rumänischen Gesellschaft ("From The Romanian Society"), two novels, 1882
 Ein Fürstenkind ("A Princely Child"), a novel, 1883
 Rumäniens Anteil am Kriege 1877-78 ("Romania's Participation in The War of 1877-78"), 1887
 as Ditto and Idem: Anna Boleyn, historic drama, 1886 (together with Carmen Sylva)
 as Ditto and Idem: Astra, an epistolary novel, 1886 (together with Carmen Sylva)
 as Ditto and Idem: Feldpost ("The Postal Service"), an epistolary novel, 1886 (together with Carmen Sylva)
 as Ditto and Idem: Rache und andere Novellen ("The Revenge and Other Short Stories"), 1888 (together with Carmen Sylva)
 as Ditto and Idem: In der Irre ("Astray"), short stories, 1887 (together with Carmen Sylva)
 Ausgewanderte ("Emigrated"), a novel, 1890
 Elina. Zwischen Kirche und Pastorat ("Elina. Between the Church and the Pastorate"), two short stories, 1894
 Sein Brief ("His Letter"), short stories, 1896
 Herr Baby. Eine Kindergeschichte ("Mr. Baby. A Child Story"), 1901
 Mann und Weib ("Man and Woman"), short stories, 1902
 Am Hofe der Ragusa ("At the Ragusa Court"), a novel, 1902
 Fatum ("Fate"), stories, 1903
 König Karol von Rumänien. Ein Lebensbild ("King Carol of Romania. A Biography"), 1903
 Carmen Sylva, a biography, 1903
 Maria, Fürstin Mutter zu Wied, Prinzessin zu Nassau. Lebensbild ("Maria, Princess-Mother of Wied, Princess of Nassau. A Biography"), 1904
 Mutterrecht ("Matriarchy"), short stories, 1906
 Eine Hilflose ("A Helpless Woman"), a novel, 1906
 Was die Welt schuldig nennt ("What The World Calls Guilty"), 1907
 Der rote Streif. Eine Liebesgeschichte ("The Red Stripe. A Love Story"), 1908
 Ist das - das Leben? ("Is This The Life?"), Roman, 1909
 Die Getäuschten ("The Deceived"), Roman, 1909
 Laut Testament ("According To The Will"), Roman, 1911
 Das Geheimnis der Weiche ("The Secret of The Gate"), stories, 1913

References

External links
 
 
 

Romanian writers
19th-century German writers
19th-century Romanian writers
19th-century German women writers
19th-century Romanian women writers
20th-century German writers
20th-century Romanian writers
20th-century German women writers
20th-century Romanian women writers
Romanian people of German descent
People from Greifswald
1852 births
1916 deaths